John Fisk (died December 20, 2004) was an American radio personality based in New York City, associated with the Pacifica Foundation's WBAI-FM.

During the 1970s and 1980s Fisk was the host of Digressions, a weekly late-night free form radio show on WBAI.

Fisk also served as broadcast consultant to the Poetry Project at St. Mark's Church for over twenty years, producing broadcasts of Poetry Project readings for WBAI.

References
Greg Fuchs,  "John Fisk, 1943-2004" , Boog City (Feb. 2005) (retrieved September 16, 2009).
R. Paul Martin, "John Fisk 1946-2004",  Web links related to the Back of the Book program of January 3, 2005 (retrieved September 16, 2009).

Radio personalities from New York City
Year of birth missing
2004 deaths